General elections were held in Zambia on 18 November 1996 to elect a President and National Assembly. They were boycotted by the main opposition party, the United National Independence Party, together with five other allied parties, following changes to the constitution which they failed to have reversed following a court challenge. The changes imposed a two-term limit on the presidency, required presidential candidates to be born to two Zambian citizens by birth or descent, and required National Assembly candidates to give up their chieftaincy. UNIP believed these changes were specifically aimed at their longtime leader, Kenneth Kaunda, whose parents were Malawian and had previously served as the country's first president from 1964 to 1991. The changes would have also excluded UNIP's vice president, a chief. Subsequently, the ruling Movement for Multi-Party Democracy won a comfortable victory in both elections, taking 131 of the 150 elected seats in the National Assembly, and its candidate, Frederick Chiluba, winning 73% of the vote in the presidential election.

Out of an estimated 4,500,000 eligible voters, only 2,267,382 registered. Amongst registered voters, turnout was 58%.

Results

President

National Assembly

See also
List of members of the National Assembly of Zambia (1996–2001)

References

1996 in Zambia
Elections in Zambia
Zambia
Presidential elections in Zambia